"Hard in da Paint" is the second single from American rapper Waka Flocka Flame's debut studio album Flockaveli.

Background 
Waka Flocka's "Hard in da Paint", like his previous hit "O Let's Do It", was originally a mixtape track. It first appeared on his fourth mixtape titled LeBron Flocka James, released on October 17, 2009. An early remix featuring French Montana was released on April 19, 2010, and appeared in the latter's ninth mixtape titled Mac & Cheese 2, released on May 6. The track was produced by up-and-coming producer Lex Luger, and went on to become an underground hit before being released as a commercial single on May 13.

Music video 
The music video was released on July 19, 2010. During the music video the production was shut down by gang activity and police presence due to the Black P. Stones Bloods gang injunction. The music video was directed by Benny Boom. It was shot on Palmwood Drive in Baldwin Village, Los Angeles, often referred to as "the Jungles", a neighborhood made infamous courtesy of the Denzel Washington movie Training Day.

Reception
In August 2014, Pitchfork listed the track at number 41 on their "The 200 Best Tracks of the Decade So Far (2010-2014)."

Remixes 
An official remix featuring French Montana was released on April 19, while a second remix featuring Gucci Mane was released on June 22.

R&B singer Ciara released her own remix of the song on June 2, 2010. Rappers 2 Chainz, Young Jeezy and Pusha T released a version of the song titled "Hard in the Kitchen" on February 11, 2011. Several rappers released freestyles over the production, including Rick Ross, Vado, Lil Flip, Haystak, Young Jeezy, Tyga, Lil Chuckee, Curren$y, Jay Rock, Crooked I, Joell Ortiz, Meek Mill, Slim Thug and Scrim from $uicideboy$.

German hip hop group Zugezogen Maskulin released a version titled "Undercut, Tumblrblog". British rapper Giggs also made his own version.

There is also a remix performed by drummer Travis Barker. Canadian jazz/instrumental hip hop band, BadBadNotGood did an arrangement of the song.

Metalcore band Of Mice & Men included samples of the track in the Warped Tour remix of their single "OG Loko".

Parodies 
A popular video parody of "Hard in da Paint" was posted on YouTube, with Barack Obama (played by comedian James Davis) as the subject of the song. The "Baracka Flacka Flames: Head of the State" video has gained over 13 million views as of 2016.

A remix by The Hood Internet which contains Waka Flocka's lyrics over a Flock of Seagulls, called "Waka Flocka Seagulls" has also been made.

"Hard in da Paint" was referred to in an episode of The Eric Andre Show, with co-host Hannibal Buress asking Lauren Conrad if she had ever listened to Waka Flocka Flame. He proceeds to rap the song's intro, with various words not associated with profanity being censored as well as the intended profanity.

Charts

Weekly charts

Year-end charts

References

2008 songs
2010 singles
Music videos directed by Benny Boom
Song recordings produced by Lex Luger (musician)
Songs written by Lex Luger (musician)
Songs written by Waka Flocka Flame
Waka Flocka Flame songs
Crunk songs